, better known by his ring name , is a Japanese professional wrestler, the first to adopt the high-flying Mexican lucha libre style. He has wrestled for New Japan Pro-Wrestling, the Universal Wrestling Federation, Michinoku Pro and All Japan Pro Wrestling and was the founder of Universal Lucha Libre. He has also had stints with the World Wrestling Federation and Extreme Championship Wrestling in the United States. His daughters Xóchitl Hamada and Ayako Hamada are professional wrestlers.

Professional wrestling career
He was one of the first dojo trainees at New Japan Pro-Wrestling, being known as Little Hamada in the beginning. He was sent to Mexico's Universal Wrestling Association because of his lack of size and he found a lot of success there - so much so that Mexican fans and promoters began calling him Gran Hamada (Great Hamada). He also competed in Empresa Mexicana de Lucha Libre, which added El (The) to the front of his name: El Gran Hamada.

In 1984, he became a member of the initial roster of the original Japanese UWF, but found that his flamboyantly acrobatic style clashed with the martial arts-inspired style and focus on realism of the UWF and soon left for All Japan Pro Wrestling. He eventually broke off from AJPW to form his own promotion in 1990: Universal Lucha Libre. However, wrestlers began to leave the group in 1993 and in 1995 Hamada closed the promotion to join Michinoku Pro, which had been formed by former Universal Lucha Libre wrestlers. On April 13, 1997, Hamada teamed with Great Sasuke and Masato Yakushiji (who substituted for Gran Naniwa, who was injured) to defeat Taka Michinoku, Dick Togo and Mens Teioh (AKA "Terry Boy") at ECW Barely Legal.

In 2001, he began competing for All Japan again, this time as a free agent. He briefly was part of the "Love Machines" stable under a mask as "Mini Love Machine" with "Super Love Machine" (Junji Hirata of New Japan, reprising his old role as "Super Strong Machine") and "Love Machine Storm" (Arashi, whose stage name literally means "storm"). They used Morning Musume's hit song "Love Machine" as their entrance theme. He would also briefly work for New Japan Pro-Wrestling's Wrestle Land brand as Makai Masked Hurricane but only wrestled two shows under that name.

His daughters Xochitl and Ayako, who are half Mexican, are also professional wrestlers.

Championships and accomplishments
All Japan Pro Wrestling
International Junior Heavyweight Tag Team League (1984) - with Mighty Inoue
Arsion
P*Mix Tag Team Championship (1 time) - with Ayako Hamada
Big Japan Pro Wrestling
BJW Heavyweight Championship (1 time)
Empresa Mexicana de Lucha Libre
NWA World Middleweight Championship (1 time)
Michinoku Pro Wrestling
Apex of Triangle Six–Man Tag Team Championship (1 time) – with The Great Sasuke and Tiger Mask
Fukumen World Tag League (2000) - with Tiger Mask IV
NWA Hollywood Wrestling
NWA Americas Heavyweight Championship (1 time)
New Japan Pro-Wrestling
One Night Eight Man Tag Team Tournament (1994) - with Shinjiro Otani, El Samurai and Great Sasuke
Pro Wrestling Illustrated
PWI ranked him #87 of the top 500 singles wrestlers of the "PWI Years" in 2003
Universal Lucha Libre
UWA/UWF Intercontinental Tag Team Championship (1 time)
UWF Super Middleweight Championship (1 time)
WWA World Junior Light Heavyweight Championship (1 time)
Universal Wrestling Association
UWA World Junior Light Heavyweight Championship (5 times)
UWA World Light Heavyweight Championship (2 times)
UWA World Middleweight Championship (3 times)
UWA World Tag Team Championship (3 times) – with Riki Choshu (1), Perro Aguayo (1) and Kendo (1)
UWA World Welterweight Championship (1 time)
WWF Light Heavyweight Championship (2 times)
World Wrestling Federation
WWF Intercontinental Tag Team Championship (1 time, inaugural and final) – with Perro Aguayo

Luchas de Apuestas record

Footnotes

References

External links
 
 

1950 births
Japanese male professional wrestlers
Living people
People from Maebashi
Professional wrestling trainers
20th-century professional wrestlers
NWA World Middleweight Champions
UWA World Tag Team Champions
21st-century professional wrestlers
UWA World Junior Light Heavyweight Champions
UWA World Middleweight Champions
UWA World Light Heavyweight Champions
NWA Americas Heavyweight Champions